Campo Seco (Spanish for "Dry Field") is an unincorporated community in Calaveras County, California. The community is in ZIP code 95226 and area code 209.

Founded by Mexicans in 1849, the mining camp was quite cosmopolitan, with forty different nationalities of miners. The town was almost destroyed by a fire in 1854, but as the placers were still producing, much of the town was rebuilt. Most of the buildings that are still standing date from after the fire. The town also contains the largest living cork oak tree in California, which was planted in 1858.

The town today is registered as California Historical Landmark #257.

The first post office was established in 1854.

Politics

Climate
According to the Köppen Climate Classification system, Campo Seco has a warm-summer Mediterranean climate, abbreviated "Csa" on climate maps.

References

External links

Unincorporated communities in California
Unincorporated communities in Calaveras County, California
California Historical Landmarks
Populated places established in 1849
1849 establishments in California